Carlos Alves Competições / Carlos Alves Competition  is a Brazilian auto racing team based in São Paulo.

External links
  

Stock Car Brasil teams